SM U-71 was one of 329 submarines serving in the Imperial German Navy in World War I. U-71 was engaged in the naval warfare and took part in the First Battle of the Atlantic.

Design
German Type UE I submarines were preceded by the longer Type U 66 submarines. U-71 had a displacement of  when at the surface and  while submerged. The submarine was powered by two  engines for use while surfaced, and two  engines for use while submerged. She had two propeller shafts.

U-71 was fitted with two  torpedo tubes (one at the starboard bow and one starboard stern), four torpedoes, and one  deck gun. She had a complement of thirty-two (twenty-eight crew members and four officers).

Operations 
U-71 came off the stocks at Hamburg (Vulcan) in January 1916, and joined the Kiel School where she remained until 7 April 1916, when she entered the North Sea to join the 1st Half Flotilla.
12 April - ? 21 April 1916. Apparently cruising in North Sea.
21 June – 8 July 1916. Northabout. Laid mines off Skerryvore.
14 October – 4 November 1916. Skagerrak. Sank 3 S.S., 1 sailing vessel.
11–23 December 1916. North Sea. Sank 2 S.S., 2 sailing vessels.
10–22 January 1917. Minelaying in North Sea, St. Magnus Bay, Shetland Isles. Returned owing to bad weather and overheating of engine.
6–21 February 1917. ? Laid mines in Loch Ewe, North Minch, off Butt of Lewis, Broad Bay and Firth of Lorne.
At sea 16 May 1917 – 8 June 1917. Possible laid mines off Tory I. Sank 1 S.S., 2 sailing vessels.
7–26 July 1917. North Sea. Locality of her mines not fixed. Sank 223 tons.
1/5 September 1917. Went out 3 times and returned, the last time with defects.
10–14 October 1917. In Baltic. Returned with defects.
20–24 December 1917. Laid mines off Dutch coast.
29 December 1917 – 2 January 1918. Laid mines off Dutch coast. ? Took 1 prize.
18–23 January 1918. Laid mines off Dutch coast.
4–15 February 1918. Laid mines off Dutch coast. Emerged from Skagerrak and returned by Sound.
18–29 March 1918. Laid mines off Dutch coast. Went out by Skagerrak. Returned to Bight.
23 April – 2 May 1918. Laid mines off Firth of Forth.
18–24 June 1918. Laid mines off Aberdeen.
Early in July – 22 July 1918. Laid mines off Firth of Forth.
? 29 September – 11 October 1918. ? Dutch coast. Submarine reports "Task given up".
23 February 1919. Surrendered at Harwich.

Summary of raiding history

References

Notes

Citations

Bibliography

World War I submarines of Germany
1915 ships
U-boats commissioned in 1915
Ships built in Hamburg
German Type UE I submarines